is a railway station on the Iida Line in Tenryū-ku, Hamamatsu, Shizuoka Prefecture, Japan, operated by Central Japan Railway Company (JR Central).

Lines
Sakuma Station is served by the Iida Line and is 63.5 kilometers from the starting point of the line at Toyohashi Station.

Station layout
The station has one ground-level side platform serving a single bi-directional track. The station building doubles as a branch of the Hamammatsu City Library, and passengers waiting for trains have access to the collection. The station formerly had an island platform, but was rebuilt in 2008.. The station is not attended.

Adjacent stations

Station history
Its name was changed to the "Sakuma stop" in 1938, and it was upgraded to a full station on February 7, 1941. On August 1, 1943, the Sanshin Railway was nationalized along with several other local lines to form the Iida line.

The station was relocated slightly to the west in 1955 as a part of rerouting of the line to avoid the rising waters of the Sakuma Dam. All freight services were discontinued in December 1971 and the station were unmanned from February 1984.  Along with its division and privatization of JNR on April 1, 1987, the station came under the control and operation of the Central Japan Railway Company.

Passenger statistics
In fiscal 2016, the station was used by an average of 11 passengers daily (boarding passengers only).

Surrounding area
 former Sakuma Town Hall

See also
 List of railway stations in Japan

References

External links

  Iida Line station information

Stations of Central Japan Railway Company
Iida Line
Railway stations in Japan opened in 1936
Railway stations in Shizuoka Prefecture
Railway stations in Hamamatsu